The César Award is the national film award of France. It is delivered in the  ceremony and was first awarded in 1976. The nominations are selected by the members of twelve categories of filmmaking professionals and supported by the French Ministry of Culture. The nationally televised award ceremony is held in Paris each year in February. The exact location has changed over the years (in the Théâtre du Châtelet from 2002 to 2016). It is an initiative of the Académie des Arts et Techniques du Cinéma, which was founded in 1975.

The César Award is considered the highest film honor in France, the French film industry's equivalent to the Molière Award for theatre, and the Victoires de la Musique for music. In cinema, it is the French equivalent to the Academy Award.

The award was created by Georges Cravenne, who was also the creator of the Molière Award for theatre. The name of the award comes from the sculptor César Baldaccini (1921–1998) who designed it.

The 48th César Awards ceremony took place on 24 February 2023. The Night of the 12th, directed by Dominik Moll, won the award for Best Film.

History
In 1974, Georges Cravenne founded the Academy of Arts and Techniques of Cinema that was, from the outset, intended to reward the achievements and the most remarkable film artwork, to have a French equivalent to the American Oscars. The first César Awards – also known as the "Night of Caesar" – were held on 3 April 1976 under the chairmanship of Jean Gabin who watched the ceremony from the front row seated in a wheelchair a few months before his death. The name of the award comes from the sculptor César, designer of the trophy awarded to the winners in each category. It is also an homage to the Raimu, the great French actor and performer of Marseille trilogy of Marcel Pagnol, in which Raimu played the character of César.

Other prizes had been awarded to French cinema in the past. Lacking popular enthusiasm compared to the Étoile de cristal, this award was discontinued after 1964.

At the inaugural César Awards, 13 awards were distributed. Today, there are 22 (in nine subcategories).

Beginning with the 43rd César ceremony in 2018, a new special award, the César du public, is given to the French film with the most box office receipts during the previous year and the beginning of the current year. This award responds to the need to reward French comedy films, which remain the most popular genre in France.

During the 45th ceremony in 2020, Adèle Haenel, a French actress playing the main character in Portrait of a Lady on Fire left the room when Roman Polanski's award for best director was announced in protest against the fact that notable sexual abusers in the film industry can receive awards when their victims are reduced to silence. Polanski was convicted of unlawful sexual intercourse with a 13-year-old in California in 1978, and has additionally been accused of other incidents of rape.

The statue

The César statues are compressed sculptures of metal objects, designed in 1975 by the sculptor César Baldaccini, a friend of Georges Cravenne who gave them their name as a wink to the Oscars, the sound of the name being close to the film César by Pagnol. These forged pieces are made from polished natural bronze, unlike the Oscars which are plated in gold. The latter directly inspired the first AATC trophy in 1976, which was a reel of film encircling a silhouette. In 1977, before a mixed reception of actors, Baldaccini unveiled the current 8 by 8 cm compression, weighing 3.6 kg and cast in the Bocquel foundry in Normandy. The cost of a César has not been officially revealed, but is estimated at around 1,500 euros.

Voting process
Voting for César Awards is conducted through two ballots by mail: the first to establish nominations per category (three to five, depending on the discipline), and the second to decide the winner.

Voters are professionals in the field, numbering about 4,000, divided into 12 colleges (actors, directors, writers, technicians, producers, distributors and international vendors, operators, agents artistic, technical industries, casting directors, press officers and members associates). The criteria for voting are: demonstrate a relatively consistent career in film and get a double sponsorship in the Académie des arts et techniques du cinéma. Nominees or winners of the previous editions are exempt from these formalities.

To aid voters, the Académie identifies each year films released in France and provides a guide to the works and eligible professionals. A DVD set of French or primarily French productions produced during the year is sent in December with the catalog of films to the electors. After the nominations are revealed, at the end of January, special screenings of the nominated films are shown at the Le Balzac cinema in Paris, near the Champs-Élysées. Each year, a special lunch for nominees is held at the famous Fouquet's restaurant on the Champs-Élysées, a few weeks before the ceremony.

Categories

Merit awards

 Best Film
 Best Director
 Best Actor
 Best Actress
 Best Supporting Actor
 Best Supporting Actress
 Most Promising Actor
 Most Promising Actress
 Best Adaptation
 Best Original Screenplay
 Best First Feature Film

 Best Foreign Film
 Best Animated Film
 Best Documentary Film
 Best Short Film
 Best Animated Short Film
 Best Cinematography
 Best Costume Design
 Best Editing
 Best Music Written for a Film
 Best Production Design
 Best Sound

Special awards
 Honorary Award - since 1976
 César des Césars - between 1985 and 1995
 Prix Daniel Toscan du Plantier - since 2008
 Trophée César & Techniques - since 2011
 Médaille d'Or - only in 2015
 César & Techniques Special Award - only between 2015 and 2017
 César & Techniques Innovation Award - since 2018
 César du public - since 2018

Retired awards
 Best Film from the European Union (2002–2004)
 Best Poster (1986–1990)
 Best Producer (1995–1996)
 Best Writing (Adaptation or Original) (1976–2005)
 Best French Language Film (1984–1986)
 Best Documentary Short (1977–1991)
 Best Fiction Short (1977–1991)
 Best Animated Short (1977–1990)

Ceremonies

Overall

Films that received five or more César Awards

Films that received 10 or more César Award nominations

Directors with two or more awards

Actors with 7 or more nominations

"Big Five" winners and nominees

Winners
The Last Metro (1980)
Best Film: François Truffaut
Best Director: François Truffaut
Best Actor: Gérard Depardieu
Best Actress: Catherine Deneuve
Best Writing: Suzanne Schiffman and François Truffaut

Amour (2013)
Best Film: Michael Haneke & Margaret Ménégoz
Best Director: Michael Haneke
Best Actor: Jean-Louis Trintignant
Best Actress: Emmanuelle Riva
Best Writing: Michael Haneke

Nominees
Four awards won
Smoking/No Smoking (1993): Best Actress (Sabine Azéma)
Too Beautiful for You (1989): Best Actor (Gérard Depardieu)

Three awards won
Cyrano de Bergerac (1990): Best Actress (Anne Brochet) and Writing (Jean-Claude Carrière and Jean-Paul Rappeneau)
Same Old Song (1997): Best Actress (Sabine Azéma) and Director (Alain Resnais)
The Artist (2011): Best Actor (Jean Dujardin) and Writing (Michel Hazanavicius)
Custody (2017): Best Actor (Denis Ménochet) and Director (Xavier Legrand)

Most acting wins and nominations for a film

See also
Academy Awards
British Academy Film Awards
Lumières Award
Louis Delluc Prize
Magritte Award

References

External links

 Official website
 

 
French film awards
Awards established in 1976
1976 establishments in France
Recurring events established in 1976
Annual events in France